Rabdiophrys is a genus of amoeboid rhizarians. It has 19 species, including the species Rabdiophrys anulifera.

It was placed before in Nucleariida.

References

Cercozoa genera